Christianity in Kosovo has a long-standing tradition dating to the Roman Empire. The entire Balkan region had been Christianized by the Roman, Byzantine, First Bulgarian Empire, Serbian Kingdom, Second Bulgarian Empire, and Serbian Empire till 13th century. After the Battle of Kosovo in 1389 until 1912, Kosovo was part of the Muslim Ottoman Empire, and a high level of Islamization occurred. During the time period after World War II, Kosovo was ruled by secular socialist authorities in the Socialist Federal Republic of Yugoslavia (SFRY). During that period, Kosovars became increasingly secularized. Today, 90% of Kosovo's population are from Muslim family backgrounds, most of whom are ethnic Albanians, but also including Slavic speakers (who mostly identify themselves as Gorani or Bosniaks) and Turks.

Eastern Orthodox Church

The Serb population, estimated at 50,000 to 100,000 people, is largely Serbian Orthodox. Kosovo has 26 monasteries and many churches, Serb Orthodox churches and monasteries, of which three are World Heritage Sites of Serbia as Medieval Monuments in Kosovo*: the Patriarchal Monastery of Peć, Visoki Decani, Our Lady of Ljeviš, and Gračanica. Dozens of churches were destroyed, and others damaged, after the end of Serbian governance in 1999, and a further 35 were damaged in the week of the albanian violence in March 2004.

Catholic Church

About three percent of ethnic Albanians in Kosovo remain members of the Catholic Church despite the conversion of most of the population to Islam since the start of Ottoman rule. During the period in which the conversion of Catholics to Islam was fastest (the second half of the sixteenth century to the end of the eighteenth century) many converts continued to practise Catholic rites in private, although the Catholic Church banned this from 1703, and as late as 1845 significant numbers of people who had passed as Muslims declared themselves to be Catholics, to avoid conscription. There are still reported cases of families "returning" to their Catholic faith - there are an estimated 65,000 Catholics in Kosovo and another 60,000 Kosovar born Catholics outside Kosovo. Mother Teresa, whose parents were from Kosovo, saw the vision which decided her upon her religious vocation at the Church of the Black Madonna at Letnica in Kosovo. The central boulevard in Pristina is named after her. A Catholic Cathedral was consecrated in Pristina in 2011, having been built on land donated by the municipality. During the Kosovo war (1999), vandalisation of Kosovo Albanian Catholic churches occurred. The Church of St Anthony located in Gjakova had major damage done by Yugoslav Serb soldiers. In Pristina, Yugoslav Serb officers ejected nuns and a priest from the Catholic church of St. Anthony and installed aircraft radar in the steeple which resulted in NATO bombing of the church and surrounding houses.

Protestantism

There is also a small number of evangelical Protestants, whose tradition dates back to the Methodist missionaries' work centered in Bitola, in the late 19th century. They are represented by the Kosovo Protestant Evangelical Church (KPEC).

Notes

See also
 Islam in Kosovo
 Catholic Church in Kosovo
 Serbian Orthodox Church in Kosovo
 Kosovo Protestant Evangelical Church
 Destruction of Albanian heritage in Kosovo
 Destruction of Serbian heritage in Kosovo

References